Songs About Death & Dying: Vol. 3 is the third studio album by American garage rock act Thee Oh Sees, released on May 30, 2005 on Narnack Records. Released under the name, OCS, the album was recorded as a duo by John Dwyer and drummer Patrick Mullins, and features experimental freak folk songs.

The album was initially released as a double album, alongside the band's fourth studio album, OCS 4: Get Stoved, and was recorded as a side-project to Dwyer's then-primary band, Coachwhips.

Reception
In a positive review for Allmusic, Alex Henderson wrote: "Dwyer and colleague Patrick Mullins combine that folk-rock influence with bizarre, experimental electro-noise and a very muffled sound. It's a strange mixture, but a strangely appealing one - and most of the time, it works."

Track listing

Personnel

OCS
John Dwyer - vocals, guitar
Patrick Mullins - drums (1, 2, 7, 9, 12), electronics (3, 10, 14), bells (14)

Additional musicians
Mike Donovan - backing vocals (4)
Matt Hartman - clarinet (3)

Recording personnel
John Dwyer - recording
Weasel Walter - mastering

Artwork
David Benzler - skull
Kottie Paloma - girl

References

2005 albums
Oh Sees albums